Antoinette de Merode (Antoinette Ghislaine; 28 September 1828 – 10 February 1864), was the Princess of Monaco by marriage to Charles III, Prince of Monaco.

Life

She was born in Brussels as the daughter of Count Werner de Merode (1797-1840) and his spouse, Countess Victoire de Spangen d'Uyternesse (1797–1845). She was the sister of Louise de Mérode and maternal aunt of Maria Vittoria dal Pozzo, for three years Queen of Spain.

On her eighteenth birthday on 28 September 1846 in Brussels, she married Charles III, Prince of Monaco. It was a double wedding with her older sister, Louise.

Thanks to her generous dowry, Prince Charles III was able to finance the embellishment of Monte Carlo in order to attract wealthy tourists to the principality.

The couple was given an official welcome in Monaco after the wedding, but preferred to live in France, where Antoinette acquired for herself the Château de Marchais, where the couple preferred to live rather than in Monaco.   On 13 November 1848, she gave birth in Paris to Albert I, Prince of Monaco. The marriage was described as a happy one, and Charles referred to her as an angel.  Known by the title Duchess de Valentinois in Paris, she became a popular member of the high society life of Second French Empire.

She often attended the French Imperial court, where she was introduced to the Empress Eugenie by Princess Maria Caroline, her mother-in-law.  She was present at French court during the state visit of Queen Victoria of Great Britain in 1855, during which she and her mother-in-law reportedly decided to arrange a marriage between her son Albert and a member of the British royal house, plans which eventually lead to the marriage between Albert and Lady Mary Victoria Douglas-Hamilton.

From 1856 until her death in 1864, she was the Princess consort of Monaco.  During the reign of her spouse, she reportedly worked hard to support her husband, who progressed further in to blindness, and her aging mother-in-law, who also supported her son as his political adviser.  In 1862, she was diagnosed with cancer, and was advised by the doctors not to leave her home in Marchais in France.

Antoinette de Merode died on 10 February 1864 in Paris (aged 35) and was interred in the Cathedral of Our Lady Immaculate, Monaco.

Ancestry

Arms and emblems

References

 Georges Martin, Histoire et généalogie de la maison de Mérode, Lyon, 1999.

|-

1828 births
1864 deaths
Nobility from Brussels
Ant
Hereditary Princesses of Monaco
House of Grimaldi
Princesses of Monaco
Burials at the Cathedral of Our Lady Immaculate